William Valentine, FAIA, (born September 13, 1937, in Winston-Salem, North Carolina) is an American architect who has practiced at HOK since beginning his career in the St. Louis office in 1962. In 1970, he moved to California to help open HOK's San Francisco office. In 2000, he was named president and design principal of HOK and in 2005 he assumed the role of chairman. Valentine retired from HOK in 2012, after 50 years with the firm. He remains HOK chairman emeritus and lives in Mill Valley, California.

Valentine received a Bachelor of Architecture degree from North Carolina State University and a Master of Architecture degree from Harvard University. He is a lecturer in Architecture at the Harvard Graduate School of Design.

In July 2019, Valentine and his wife, Jane, donated $250,000 to help fund construction of the new Whiteville High School, their alma mater, in Whiteville, North Carolina.

Architectural expression 
As a Fellow of the American Institute of Architects and a Leadership in Energy and Environmental Design (LEED) credentialed professional, Valentine has been a frequent speaker and author on sustainable design. He is a recognized leader for sustainability within the architectural profession.

Valentine has described his definition of good design as “a simple idea, elegantly executed and inspiring, with social significance and in harmony with the environment.” He is a strong advocate for simplicity and efficiency and the "power of using less" as essential concepts of sustainable architecture, and attributes his philosophy—that "all designs should be very simple….we should work to solve our clients' needs and to be helpful to the world"—to the influence of HOK co-founder Gyo Obata.

Valentine is a self-proclaimed "evangelist" for affordable net zero carbon emissions design. In 2009–2010, he led an HOK team that collaborated with The Weidt Group to create a market-rate, zero-emissions prototype design for a Class A commercial office building in St. Louis, Missouri.

Selected projects 
Wellmark Blue Cross Blue Shield Association Headquarters, 2010 (Des Moines, Iowa), LEED Platinum certification
Net Zero Court Zero Emissions Office Building Prototype, 2010 (St. Louis, Missouri)
Biogen Idec Research and Development Campus, 2005 (San Diego, California)
Nortel Carling R&D Campus, 2001 (Ottawa, Ontario, Canada)
Phoenix Municipal Courthouse, 1999 (Phoenix, Arizona)
Microsoft Campus, 1998 (Redmond, Washington)
Adobe Systems Headquarters, 1996 (San Jose, California)
Apple Inc. R&D Campus, 1993 (Cupertino, California)
King Khalid International Airport, 1983 (Riyadh, Saudi Arabia)
Levi Strauss & Co. Levi's Plaza, 1982 (San Francisco, California)
Moscone Center, 1981 (San Francisco, California)

Honors 
In recognition of his commitment to design excellence and sustainable design leadership, Valentine accepted the "Legend" Award at the Annual Interiors Awards hosted by Contract magazine in 2007. The Legend honor recognizes individuals whose lifetime achievements have contributed in a significant way to improving the practice of commercial interior design and architecture.

"Valentine's passion and unbridled enthusiasm for design and life are still highly apparent in everything he does,” wrote Contract editor in chief Jennifer Busch at the time of the award. “Not the least bit content to rest on his laurels, earned from a long and distinguished design career that has included significant leadership roles at one of the world's largest and most corporate design firms, Valentine still is looking for ways to improve the industry and his clients' businesses. His current and ongoing passion for sustainable design in architecture and his genuine humility and kindness also speak to his commitment to improving the world around him."

Valentine's awards include being named "Corporate Real Estate Executive of the Year" by CoreNet Global's Northern California Chapter and being honored with the "Outstanding Business Executive" award by the American Public Transportation Association. He presented the "essentials of green building" as a Master Speaker at Greenbuild 2005 in Atlanta.

References

External links 
Official HOK website
Collection of video interviews with Bill Valentine

1937 births
Living people
North Carolina State University alumni
Architects from San Francisco
Fellows of the American Institute of Architects
Harvard Graduate School of Design alumni